Steven Lee Taaffe (born 10 September 1979 ) is an English former footballer who played in the Football League for Stoke City.

Career
Taaffe was born in Stoke-on-Trent and began his career with local side Stoke City making his debut towards the end of the 1997–98 season making three substitute appearances. He made a further three appearances in 1998–99 and 1999–2000 but was not able to establish himself in the first team and was released in the summer of 2000. He went on to play for non-league Northwich Victoria.

Career statistics
Source:

References

External links
 

1979 births
Living people
English footballers
Stoke City F.C. players
Northwich Victoria F.C. players
English Football League players
Association football forwards